The synagogues of Kraków are a collection of monuments of Jewish sacred architecture in Poland. The seven main synagogues of the Jewish District of Kazimierz constitute the largest such complex in Europe next to Prague. These are:

 The Old Synagogue
 Wolf Popper Synagogue
 Remah Synagogue
 High Synagogue
 Izaak Synagogue
 Temple Synagogue
 Kupa Synagogue

(it is worth noting 2 other houses of prayer, both from the 19th century, which could easily be classed as synagogues, both of them on Mieselsa street: the B'nea Emun prayer house and the Hevre Tehillim, psalm brotherhood house of prayer)

It is a unique on the European scale religious complex prescribed on the list of UNESCO world heritage sites along with the entire city district in 1978, as the first ever.

History
Kraków was an influential centre of Jewish spiritual life before the outbreak of World War II, with all its manifestations of religious observance from Orthodox, to Chasidic and Reform flourishing side by side. There were at least ninety prayer-houses in Kraków active before the Nazi German invasion of Poland, serving its burgeoning Jewish community of 60,000–80,000 (out of the city's total population of 237,000), established since the early 12th century.

Most synagogues of Kraków were ruined during World War II by the Nazis who despoiled them of all ceremonial objects, and used them as storehouses for ammunition, firefighting equipment, and as general storage facilities. The post-Holocaust Jewish population of the city had dwindled to about 5,900 before the end of the 1940s, and by 1978, the number was further reduced in size to a mere 600 by some estimates.

In recent time, thanks to the efforts of the local Jewish and Polish organizations including foreign financial aid from Akiva Kahane, many synagogues and prayer-houses underwent major restorations, while others continue to serve as apartments.

Main synagogues
The synagogues of Kraków represent virtually all European architectural styles of the past millennium, including Gothic, Renaissance, Baroque, Neoclassicism and Modernism. Among the most prominent are: the Old Synagogue, the High Synagogue, Remah Synagogue, Wolf Popper Synagogue, Tempel Synagogue, Kupa Synagogue and the Izaak Jakubowicz Synagogue. At present, only two of them are still active, and only one serves as a house of prayer, the Remuh Synagogue.

The Jewish History Museum

The Old Synagogue on Szeroka Street, is the oldest Jewish house of prayer in Poland, built in 1407. Nowadays, the synagogue serves as the Jewish History Museum, a Division of the Historical Museum of Kraków. The exhibits are divided into four sections: synagogue furnishings and paraphernalia, Jewish rituals and festivals, the history of Kazimierz District, and the Holocaust. The museum features numerous items related to religious ceremonies, for example, candle holders, Chanukah and menorot lamps, covers for the Torah, parochot Holy Ark covers, tallit prayer shawls, and kippahs or yarmulkes. The museum holds also a considerable collection of books including 2,500 volumes of Hebrew manuscripts and prints. On the walls, there are original oil paintings on display made by Maurycy Gottlieb, Józef Mehoffer, Tadeusz Popiel, Jerzy Potrzebowski and Jonasz Stern.

The Remah Synagogue

The Remah Synagogue on the west side of Szeroka, currently one of the few functioning synagogues in the city, is perhaps the most interesting of all Kraków's synagogues, built along the old row houses (kamienice). It was founded in 1556 by a royal banker, Izrael (Isserl) son of Joseph, for his own son the great rabbi Moses Isserles also known as Remah, who already in his youth was famed for his erudition. There are also a Remah Cemetery named after him, and the mikvah. Located further down on Szeroka Street is the Synagogue of Wolf Popper, the father of Joachim Edler von Popper. It serves as a bookshop now.

The High Synagogue

Equally notable are the High Synagogue on Jozefa Street, built in 1556-1563 in a Romanesque style,  and the Kupa Synagogue, founded in 1643 by the Jewish district's kehilla (a municipal self-government) as foundation for the local kahal. The Isaak Jakubowicz Synagogue built in 1644, is located on Kupa Street. Currently it houses Kraków's Chabad Lubavitch community. The Tempel Synagogue on Miodowa Street, was designed in the 1860s, on the pattern of the Leopoldstädter Tempel in Vienna, at a time when Kraków was part of the Austro-Hungarian Empire. Right after World War II a mikvah was built at the side of the Tempel Synagogue, as the Remah Synagogue's mikvah was no longer able to serve. (The mikvah at the Tempel Synagogue is currently serving men only). On Józefa Street, there's the Kowea Itim le-Tora House of Prayer established in 1810 (probably built before this time). It was once owned by the Society for the Study of the Torah hence its name.

Active synagogues 
 Remah Synagogue
 Kupa Synagogue
 Izaak Jakubowicz Synagogue
 Tempel Synagogue

Inactive synagogues 
 Bobov Synagogue (Kraków)
 Old Synagogue, now housing a Jewish History museum
 Wolf Popper Synagogue
 High Synagogue

Gallery

List of Kraków synagogues by street name 

For list of Synagogues in alphabetical order, please use table-sort buttons.

{| class="wikitable sortable" width="90%" align="left" style="background:#FFFFFF; font-size:95%; border:0px solid #a3bfb1; color:#000;"
! scope="col" style="width: 3em;" | #
! scope="col" style="width: 10em;" | Street
! scope="col" | Synagogue
|-
|  || Św. Agnieszki 5 || Cypres Hirsch Michael Synagogue (Stowarzyszenia Modłów i Dobroczynności) 
|-
|  || Św. Agnieszki 11 || Meisels Izrael Synagogue 
|-
|  || Augustiańska 22/12 || Beit Shlomo Synagogue 
|-
|  || Augustiańska 22 || Chasids from Radomsko Synagogue 
|-
|  || Augustiańska 25 ||Tiferes Israel Synagogue
|-
|  || Bocheńska 4|| Szejrit Bne Emun Synagogue
|-
|  || Bonifraterska 1 || Bet Hamidrash Synagogue 
|-
|  || Brzozowa 9 || Ansche Chail Synagogue
|-
|  || Brzozowa 6 || Deiches Salomon Synagogue
|-
|  || Brzozowa 17 || Planczner Synagogue
|-
|  || Celna 5 || Rabi Skawiński Synagogue
|-
|  || Ciemna 15 || Chasids from Radomsko Synagogue
|-
|  || Ciemna 17 || Chewra Sandlers Synagogue
|-
|  || Dębnicki Square (pl. Dębnicki 6) || Jedność Izraela Synagogue
|-
|  || Dietla 17 || Chasids from Działoszyce Synagogue
|-
|  || Dietla 58 || Chajotim Synagogue
|-
|  || Dietla 64 || Damash Synagogue
|-
|  || Dietla 64 || Chasids from Piaseczno Synagogue
|-
|  || Dietla 107 || Bet Hamidrash Synagogue
|-
|  || Długa 22 || Dorshe Shalom Synagogue
|-
|  || Długa  || Grosmann Synagogue
|-
|  || Estery 6 || Chasids from Czortków Synagogue
|-
|  || Estery 6 || Chasids from Dzikowo Synagogue
|-
|  || Estery 6 || Talmud Torah Synagogue
|-
|  || Estery 6 || Chasids from Góra Kalwaria Synagogue
|-
|  || Estery 12 || Bobov Synagogue
|-
|  || Estery 12 || Chaim Halberstam Synagogue
|-
|  || St Gertrudy 20 || Lejw Tojw Synagogue
|-
|  || Grodzka 28 || Tigner Mordechaj Synagogue
|-
|  || Izaaka 7 || Chewra Szijur Synagogue
|-
|  || Izaaka 7 || Dajons Majer Synagogue
|-
|  || Izaaka 5 || Stowarzyszenia Bóżniczego Szir (Szijer) Synagogue
|-
|  || Jakuba 21 || Mosi Hamite Synagogue
|-
|  || Jakuba ? || Ansche Emes Synagogue
|-
|  || Józefa 8 || Aufim Synagogue
|-
|  || Józefa 22 || Ahawat Tora Synagogue
|-
|  || Józefa 24 || Chasids from Stropkowo Synagogue
|-
|  || Józefa 5 || Chewra Kadisza Synagogue
|-
|  || Józefa 32 || Chewra Ner Tamid (High) Synagogue
|-
|  || Józefa 12 || Etz Chaim Synagogue
|-
|  || Józefa 42 || Kowea Itim le-Tora Synagogue
|-
|  || Józefa 16 || Kromol Synagogue (annex)
|-
|  || Józefa 16 || Krymałowska Synagogue
|-
|  || Józefa 22 || Machsike Jesziwa Keter (Kejser) Tora Synagogue
|-
|  || Józefa 33 || Reb Aron Klaus Synagogue
|-
|  || Józefa 15 || Chasids from Radom Synagogue (New) (Stowarzyszenia Modlitwy i Dobroczynności)
|-
|  || Józefa 26 || Chasids from Żarki Synagogue
|-
|  || Józefa 37 || Epsztein Aron Synagogue
|-
|  || Kalwaryjska 21 || Chewra Thilim Synagogue
|-
|  || Kalwaryjska 21 || Nose Hamitah Synagogue
|-
|  || Kalwaryjska 26 || Rabi from Zielin Synagogue
|-
|  || Kalwaryjska 29 || Gmilus Chasudim & Menachem Aweilim Synagogue
|-
|  || Katarzyny 5 || Chasids from Husiatyń Synagogue
|-
|  || Kościuszki 27 || Bet Hamidrash Synagogue
|-
|  || Krakowska 7 || Bojaner Synagogue
|-
|  || Krakowska 21 || Chewra Sandlers Synagogue
|-
|  || Krakowska 26 || Bojaner Synagogue
|-
|  || Krakowska  || Gmilus Chasudim Talmud Tora Synagogue
|-
|  || Krakowska 51 || Joller Synagogue
|-
|  || Krakowska 29 || Meisels Berisch Synagogue
|-
|  || Krakowska 13 || Susser Leib Synagogue
|-
|  || Krakowska 21 || Tomchej Orajse Synagogue
|-
|  || Krakusa 7 || Rabinacka Synagogue
|-
|  || Kupa 16 || Ner Tamid Synagogue
|-
|  || Kupa 16 || Mizrahi Synagogue
|-
|  || Lelewela 5 (later Tatarska 4) || Bnei Jeszurim Synagogue
|-
|  || Limanowskiego 13 || Bikur Cholim Synagogue
|-
|  || Matejki Square (pl. Matejki 4) || Bet Hamidrash Synagogue
|-
|  || Matejki Square 2 || Adas Jeszurim Synagogue
|-
|  || Mazowiecka  || Bet Hamidrash Synagogue
|-
|  || Meiselsa 14 || Aleksander Synagogue
|-
|  || Meiselsa 17 (pl. Nowy 5) || Bnej Emun Synagogue
|-
|  || Meiselsa 18 || Chewra Thilim Synagogue
|-
|  || Meiselsa 14 || Chasids from Aleksandrowo Synagogue
|-
|  || Meiselsa 32 || Lykower Synagogue
|-
|  || Meiselsa 1 || Tycziner Synagogue
|-
|  || Miodowa 11 || Assiriri (Machsi Ke-Choklim) Synagogue
|-
|  || Miodowa 15 || Beit (Bet) Israel Synagogue
|-
|  || Miodowa 13 || Chasids from Cieszanowo Synagogue
|-
|  || Miodowa 12 || Temichas Narej Bnej Israel Synagogue
|-
|  || Mostowa 8 || Chana and Abraham Lednitzer Synagogue 
|-
|  || Mostowa 2 || Nosei Massu Haszejno Synagogue
|-
|  || Na Przejściu 2/77 (Dajwór 23) || Gewoha Bargiel Synagogue Na Górce
|-
|  || Nowy Square 1 (pl. Nowy 1) || Chaduzim Synagogue
|-
|  || Nowy Square 7 || Chowewe Tora Synagogue
|-
|  || Podbrzezie 4 || Horowitz Aszer Synagogue
|-
|  || Podbrzezie 6 || Mcyjrim Imizgagim jad Charucium Synagogue
|-
|  || Podbrzezie 6 || Reichenberg Chaim (from Zaleszczyki) Synagogue
|-
|  || Podbrzezie 6 || Rosenbaum Synagogue
|-
|  || Podgórski Square (pl. Podgórski 3) || Benzion Halberstam Synagogue
|-
|  || K. Brodzinskiego 8  || Schornstein Synagogue
|-
|  || Prądnik Czerwony  || Landesdorfer Synagogue
|-
|  || Rakowicka 14 || Bejt Jehuda Synagogue
|-
|  || Rękawka 30 || Anszei Chail Synagogue
|-
|  || Skałeczna 3 || Bach Synagogue
|-
|  || Skawińska 2 || Synagogue in Jewish Hospital 
|-
|  || Starowiślna 37 || Agudas Achim Synagogue
|-
|  || Stroma 11 || Bikur Cholim Synagogue
|-
|  || Szeroka 16 || Ner Tamid Synagogue
|-
|  || Szeroka 40 || Ner Tamid Synagogue
|-
|  || Szeroka 28 || Gmilus Chasidim Debais Hakneses Synagogue (Stara)
|-
|  || Szeroka 2 || Landau Szaul Synagogue
|-
|  || Szeroka 40 || Mekarwin Latora Synagogue
|-
|  || Szeroka 28 || Reichenberg Synagogue
|-
|  || Szeroka 25 || Szezarim Synagogue
|-
|  || Szeroka 24 || Szomrim Laboker Synagogue
|-
|  || Szeroka 24 || Szywe Kryjim Synagogue
|-
|  || Szewska 1/2 || Chasids from Bobowa Synagogue
|-
|  || Szlak 13 || Merkaz Jeszyja Synagogue
|-
|  || Szpitalna 24 || Ahawas Rajim Synagogue (now Eastern Orthodox church)
|-
|  || Tatarska 4 || Bnei Jeszurim Synagogue
|-
|  || Trynitarska 18 || Bet Hamidrash Synagogue
|-
|  || Twardowskiego 15 || Ansche Emes Synagogue
|-
|  || Warszauera 8 || Ner Tamid Synagogue
|-
|  || Warszauera 1 || Zauwche Zywche Cedek Synagogue
|-
|  || Św. Wawrzyńca 9 || Ahawat Szalom Synagogue
|-
|  || Węgierska 6 || Bnei Emun Synagogue
|-
|  || Węgierska 6 || Bnei Chinim Synagogue
|-
|  || Węgierska  || Zucker Synagogue (Podgórze)
|-
|  || Węgierska 7 || Chasids from Góra Kalwaria Synagogue
|-
|  || Węgierska 7 || Benzion Halberstam Synagogue
|-
|  || Węgłowa 3 || Chasids from Bełz Synagogue
|-
|  || Wolnica Square (pl. Wolnica 14) || Chasids from Husiatyn Synagogue
|-
|  || Zwierzyniec 21 || Cendeszim Synagogue
|- class="sortbottom"
! # !! Street 
| 
|}

See also

 New Jewish Cemetery, Kraków
 Remuh Cemetery, Kraków

Notes and references

External links

 List of synagogues and Betei Midrash in Kraków between the wars
 Traces of the Past,  Synagogues of Krakow
 Engraving of synagogue interior
 A guide to Kazimierz, Krakow's Jewish Quarter including the Old Synagogue: ul. Szeroka 24
  Who's who in the Jewish World?
 The Museum of the Jewish People at Beit Hatfutsot, The Remuh Synagogue of Krakow, Poland
 The Jews of Kraków and its Surrounding Towns,  The "Old" (Remuh) Cemetery of Krakow
 Michał Rożek, Żydowskie zabytki krakowskiego Kazimierza, Kraków 1990,   
 Aneta Kalemba, "Poland: Online presentation"
 Jewish guide and genealogy in Poland - Casimir / Kazimierz